Luis Correa Maurelios (25 August 1897 – 14 August 1949) was a Chilean boxer who competed in the 1924 Summer Olympics. In 1924 he was eliminated in the first round of the light heavyweight class after losing his fight to Georges Rossignon.

References

1897 births
1949 deaths
Light-heavyweight boxers
Olympic boxers of Chile
Boxers at the 1924 Summer Olympics
Chilean male boxers
19th-century Chilean people
20th-century Chilean people